Deerfield Township is a township in Cass County, Minnesota, United States. The population was 154 as of the 2000 census. Deerfield Township was named for the large population of deer within its borders.

Geography

Lakes
 Cranberry Lake
 Deer Lake
 Duffy Lake
 First Perch Lake
 First Trestle Lake
 Goose Lake
 Haynes Lake
 Lee Lake
 Long Lake
 North Haynes Lake
 Ox Camp Lake
 Perch Lake
 Pine Mountain Lake (west half)
 Second Perch Lake
 Second Trestle Lake
 Sleepy Island Lake
 Third Perch Lake

Adjacent townships
 Hiram Township (north)
 Birch Lake Township (northeast)
 Powers Township (east)
 Pine River Township (southeast)
 Bull Moose Township (south)
 McKinley Township (southwest)
 Badoura Township, Hubbard County (west)
 White Oak Township, Hubbard County (northwest)

Demographics
As of the census of 2000, there were 154 people, 53 households, and 41 families residing in the township. The population density was 4.8 people per square mile (1.8/km2). There were 117 housing units at an average density of 3.6/sq mi (1.4/km2). The racial makeup of the township was 99.35% White and 0.65% Asian.

There were 53 households, out of which 35.8% had children under the age of 18 living with them, 77.4% were married couples living together, 1.9% had a female householder with no husband present, and 20.8% were non-families. 17.0% of all households were made up of individuals, and 9.4% had someone living alone who was 65 years of age or older. The average household size was 2.91 and the average family size was 3.36.

In the township the population was spread out, with 33.1% under the age of 18, 4.5% from 18 to 24, 21.4% from 25 to 44, 24.7% from 45 to 64, and 16.2% who were 65 years of age or older. The median age was 38 years. For every 100 females, there were 105.3 males. For every 100 females age 18 and over, there were 98.1 males.

The median income for a household in the township was $31,944, and the median income for a family was $32,361. Males had a median income of $16,250 versus $19,583 for females. The per capita income for the township was $13,681. About 4.3% of families and 9.4% of the population were below the poverty line, including 18.9% of those under the age of eighteen and 5.3% of those 65 or over.

References
 United States National Atlas
 United States Census Bureau 2007 TIGER/Line Shapefiles
 United States Board on Geographic Names (GNIS)

Townships in Cass County, Minnesota
Brainerd, Minnesota micropolitan area
Townships in Minnesota